The Prisoner of War Medal 1940–1945 was a Belgian war service medal established by royal decree on 20 October 1947 and awarded to all members of the Belgian Armed Forces imprisoned by Axis Forces during the Second World War.

Award description
The Prisoner of War Medal 1940–1945 was a 38 mm in diameter circular bronze medal surmounted by a three-dimensional 25 mm high royal crown mounted on a pin giving the entire assembly (medal and crown) a height of 64 mm.  The obverse bore a broadsword pointing down superimposed over a Greek cross with slightly flared ends and bisecting the years "1940" and "1945" inscribed in relief on the lateral cross arms.  Two triangular laurel leaves protrude from between the cross arms fanning out.  A ring of barbed wire encircles the cross along the entire circumference 3mm from the medal's edge.  The reverse bore a guard tower and prison camp fence surrounded by a chain along the entire circumference 3mm from the medal's edge.

The medal was suspended by a ring through the crown's orb from a 37 mm wide black silk moiré ribbon with narrow longitudinal 1 mm red/black/yellow/black/red stripes 2 mm from the edges.  Years of imprisonment were denoted on the ribbon by small striated metal bars.

Notable recipients (partial list)
The individuals listed below were awarded the Prisoner of War Medal:
Lieutenant General Albert Baron Crahay
Cavalry Lieutenant General Marcel Jooris
Lieutenant General Sir Louis Teysen
Lieutenant General Constant Weyns
Major General Maurice Jacmart
Cavalry Lieutenant General Sir Maximilien de Neve de Roden
Lieutenant General Alphonse Verstraete
Lieutenant General Baron Raoul de Hennin de Boussu-Walcourt
Lieutenant General Joseph Leroy
Lieutenant General Fernand Vanderhaeghen
Lieutenant General Robert Oor
Lieutenant General Libert Elie Thomas
Lieutenant General Léon Bievez
Major General Jean Buysse
Major General Paul Jacques
Aviator Major General Norbert Leboutte
Chaplain General Louis Kerremans
Count Pierre Harmel
Guy Cudell
Count Gatien du Parc Locmaria
Baron Gilbert Thibaut de Maisières
Count Charles of Limburg Stirum

See also

 List of Orders, Decorations and Medals of the Kingdom of Belgium

References

Other sources
 Quinot H., 1950, Recueil illustré des décorations belges et congolaises, 4e Edition. (Hasselt)
 Cornet R., 1982, Recueil des dispositions légales et réglementaires régissant les ordres nationaux belges. 2e Ed. N.pl.,  (Brussels)
 Borné A.C., 1985, Distinctions honorifiques de la Belgique, 1830–1985 (Brussels)

External links
Bibliothèque royale de Belgique (In French)
Les Ordres Nationaux Belges (In French)
ARS MORIENDI Notables from Belgian history (In French and Dutch)

Military awards and decorations of Belgium
Awards established in 1947
1947 establishments in Belgium
 
Prisoner-of-war medals